Jane Margaret Downs (22 January 1935 – 20 May 2015) was an English actress.

Downs was born in Bromley, Kent, England. She started her career in the theatre, and later appeared on radio and in film, playing Kenneth More's wife in A Night to Remember (1958). Her first husband, Gerald Harper, appeared in the same film.

During the 1970s, she appeared on stage and television alongside Terence Alexander, whom she married in 1976, following her divorce from Harper.

She died in London in May 2015 at the age of 80.
In 1991, Downs appeared in a cameo role as Daisy Williams, a new resident, in Waiting for God.

Filmography

References

External links

1935 births
2015 deaths
English stage actresses
English film actresses
English television actresses